A micron (micrometre) is the measurement used to express the diameter of wool fibre. Fine wool fibers have a low micron value. Fibre diameter is the most important characteristic of wool in determining its value.

Every fleece comprises a very wide range of fibre diameters—for example a typical Merino fleece will contain fibres of as low as 10 microns in diameter, and there could be fibres with diameters exceeding 25 microns, depending on the age and health (or nutrition) of the sheep. What is usually referred to as wool's "micron" is the mean of the fibre diameters or average diameter. This may be measured in a number of different ways.

Small samples can be taken from the side or fleece of a sheep and measured using a portable instrument such as an OFDA2000 (Optical Fibre Diameter Analyser); or a mobile instrument system called a Fleecescan. Both these systems have been studied extensively and if used correctly, they should give reasonably reliable results. Pre wool classing micron test results are a useful guide for classers in determining lines of wool to be made. Samples of fleece can also be shorn from the animal and sent to a laboratory for measurement ("midside sampling"). Most modern fleece-testing laboratories use related instruments to those mentioned—either the OFDA models or the Laserscan. Merino stud rams are mid-side sampled and the test results are displayed in the sale catalogues.

Once the fleeces are baled and prepared for sale as lots, they are commonly sampled by coring in the broker store and the samples sent to certification laboratories. Here the core samples are cleaned, dried and prepared for measurement under strict test methods. Merino wools are normally measured on Laserscan instruments in Australia, New Zealand and South Africa, although OFDA instruments may also be used in some cases (the results from these two types of instrument are quite similar). The “coefficient of variation of fibre diameter” (CVD) is a measure of the variation in fibre fineness within the sample fleece, relative to the average fibre diameter. Crossbred and coarse wools are often measured for mean fibre diameter by older instruments—"Airflow" in many parts of the world, and even a projection microscope in some cases.

Weaner and hogget wool is finer and generally more valuable than the wool from older sheep. Most wool between 11.5 and 24 microns in fibre diameter is made into clothing. The remainder is used for other textiles such as blankets, insulation and furnishings.

The finest bale of wool ever auctioned sold for a seasonal record of 269,000 cents per  during June, 2008. This bale was produced by the Hillcreston Pinehill Partnership and measured 11.6 microns, 72.1% yield and had a 43 Newtons per kilotex strength measurement. The bale realised $247,480 and was exported to India.

In 2010 a soft ultra-fine, 10 micron fleece, from Windradeen, near Pyramul, New South Wales set a new world record in the fineness of wool fleeces when it won the Ermenegildo Zegna Vellus Aureum International Trophy.

See also
 S number (wool)
 Spinning count
 Staple (wool)
 Wool
 Wool classing

References

External links
 The Australian Wool Testing Authority - Yield & Diameter testing

Sheep wool